Defending champion Diede de Groot and her partner Aniek van Koot defeated Marjolein Buis and Giulia Capocci in the final, 6−1, 6−1 to win the ladies' doubles wheelchair tennis title at the 2019 Wimbledon Championships. It was their third step towards an eventual Grand Slam.

De Groot and Yui Kamiji were the defending champions, but did not participate together. Kamiji partnered Jordanne Whiley, but was defeated in the semifinals by de Groot and van Koot.

Seeds

Draw

Finals

External links
WC Women's Doubles

Women's Wheelchair Doubles
Wimbledon Championship by year – Wheelchair women's doubles